Sarocharu is a 2012 Indian Telugu-language romantic comedy film directed by Parasuram starring Ravi Teja and Kajal Aggarwal in the lead roles. Richa Gangopadhyay played an imaginary role by combining the faces of Sandhya and Karthik's friend's wife (in the film). The film was produced on Three Angels Studio Pvt. Ltd. banner by Priyanka Dutt and was presented by Vyjayanthi banner. Devi Sri Prasad scored the soundtrack for the film. The film was released on 21 December 2012.

Plot 
Sandhyaa Arun is a student who is madly in love with Karthik, a techie based in Italy. She decides to travel with him to India, confident that the travel time would be enough for her to get him to fall in love. Karthik reciprocates her gestures in a friendly way. However, he finally reveals that he is married to Vasudha but is waiting to seek divorce.

Sandhya learns about Karthik's stint in Subramaniapuram as a football coach and about his affair with Vasudha, and that he wants to divorce her because of incompatibility. She also realizes that despite all that baggage, she still has feelings for him. At this point, Karthik springs a surprise and reveals a shocking bit of information that he is not married and the story he narrated was his friend's and told it so that it should not repeat in their life as he loved her too. This infuriates her to the core and leaves him breaking in tears.

Into this comes in Gautham, who is Sandhya's brother-in-law and madly in love with her. Based on her mother's suggestion, she agrees to marry Gautham. Gautham observes that she still loves Karthik and goes to talk with him. After a conversation, he realises the sincerity in Karthik's love. He lets Sandhya realize it and lets her go to him on their engagement day. Unfortunately, all goes vain as Sandhya knows that Karthik left to Ooty leaving her. Finally she too goes to Ooty after three months and reunites with him.

Cast

Production

Development 
Parasuram, who directed Ravi Teja's Anjaneyulu directed the film and music director Devi Sri Prasad, who previously worked with Ravi Teja for Venky provided the music. Amala Paul and Trisha backed out of the project citing date issues paving the way for Kajal Aggarwal to bag the heroine role eventually. Richa Gangopadhyay eventually won the place of the second heroine in this film. The film was named "Sarosthara" but later it was changed to "Sarocharu" which was confirmed by Richa in her Twitter. This is the second film Ravi Teja is working with Kajal Agarwal after Veera and with Richa Gangopadhyay after Mirapakay. Nara Rohit, the nephew of former Chief Minister of Andhra Pradesh Nara Chandrababu Naidu, and veteran actors Jayasudha and Chandra Mohan hired for important roles. In November, a set of stills and 2 First Look Posters were Launched which got stunning response. It was also reported later that the pair of Ravi Teja and Kajal will be seen in a very beautiful romantic track that is expected to be a highlight of the movie.

Filming 
Sarocharu, to be produced by Vyjayanthi Movies, will go on the floors from 16 June in Ooty but postponed to 1 July<ref>{{cite web|author=Sashidhar AS, TNN |url=http://articles.timesofindia.indiatimes.com/2012-06-14/news-interviews/32234708_1_shooting-entertainer-kajal-agarwal |archive-url=https://web.archive.org/web/20130928034524/http://articles.timesofindia.indiatimes.com/2012-06-14/news-interviews/32234708_1_shooting-entertainer-kajal-agarwal |url-status=dead |archive-date=28 September 2013 |title=Ravi Tejas "Sir Osthara" shooting postponed – |work=The Times of India |date=14 June 2012 |access-date=4 August 2012}}</ref> and again postponed to 8 July. The new schedule of the film started on 29 July 2012. In this flick, Ravi Teja plays the role of a Football Coach and Richa tweeted her character name to be Vasudha. After wrapping up a schedule in Ooty, the unit members flew to Italy and the film was shot for 12 days and later they moved to Germany to complete the schedule and there scenes Ft. Ravi Teja and Kajal Agarwal were shot. During the shooting of the schedule, it was reported that the film will be shot in exotic places of Italy and Switzerland. In the end of September 2012, The song "Racha Rambola" was shot in RFC, Hyderabad and it was reported that Richa is shaking leg along with Ravi Teja in the song and Richa loved the song. In November, it was declared that the film is in the last leg of shooting and except for a song, most part of the film has already been wrapped up. In the end of November, the shooting of the film was wrapped up. Leading distributors Blue Sky, who were associated with films like 100% Love, Gabbar Singh and Sri Rama Rajyam, purchased the overseas rights for an undisclosed price which is said to be the highest ever for Ravi Teja in overseas area.

 Release 
The film was cleared by Central Board of Film Certification on 19 December 2012. The film was released on 21 December 2012. The film was released in 450 screens worldwide. The film was also dubbed and released in Hindi as Jabardast Aashiq'' in 2016.

Critical reception 
The film received Positive - Mixed Reviews from Critics.
123telugu stated that " Overall, Sarocharu ends up being an OK watch. " and has given a rating 3/5 for the film. SuperGoodMovies stated that " Go and Watch Sarocharu, It is just one time watchable movie because of Raviiteja. " and has given a rating 2.25/5 for the film.  Oneindia entertainment has given a rating 3/5 for the film. Apherald stated that "Ravi teja sank his ship yet again with Kajal over shadowing him in this film. Justification for 'Manchi Prema Katha Tho' is incomplete with multiple errors" and has given a rating 2/5 for the film.

Box office 
The film has collected $7,037 from 15 screens in the US in its second weekend and the per screen average is $469. The film has collected  in ten days in US. The film grossed  worldwide at the box office.

Home media 
The VCD's, DVD's and Blu-rays of the film were released on 3 May 2013 with prices of $9.99 per DVD and $19.99 per Blu-ray through the manufacturer Bhavani DVD.

Soundtrack 

Producer Priyanka Dutt advised that Aditya Music purchased the audio rights and audio will be released through it for the film. The audio of the film was released directly into market without audio launch on 5 December 2012. Music of the film was composed by Devi Sri Prasad. The album consists of five songs. Lyrics for the two songs were penned by Ramajogayya Sastry and remaining songs were written by Srimani, Anantha Sreeram, Chandrabose. Devi Sri Prasad himself sung a song in the album.

Reception 
The album has received a good response. 123telugu stated that "Decent album from DSP". Apherald.com gave a rating 2.5/5 for the album and stated that "Devi Sri Prasad’s magical tunes are missing to core in the audio of this film".

References

External links 
 

2012 films
Films scored by Devi Sri Prasad
Films shot in Ooty
2012 masala films
2010s Telugu-language films
Films directed by Parasuram